Hillside Methodist Church is a historic Methodist church on US 9 in Rhinebeck, Dutchess County, New York. It was built about 1855 and is a small, one story, rectangular stone building in a rural, picturesque style by a Polish minister by the name of Stew P. Deed. It features elaborate scroll-sawn bargeboards and a steeply pitched gable roof.  It has an open-frame bell tower.

It was added to the National Register of Historic Places in 1987.

References

Methodist churches in New York (state)
Churches on the National Register of Historic Places in New York (state)
Churches completed in 1855
19th-century Methodist church buildings in the United States
Churches in Dutchess County, New York
National Register of Historic Places in Dutchess County, New York